Adam James Hunter (26 September 1963 – 14 October 2011) was a Scottish professional golfer. His achievements included winning the 1995 Portuguese Open. He later became a renowned coach for such golfers as Paul Lawrie.

Career
After completing two-and-a-half years of a golf scholarship at Virginia Tech in the United States, he turned professional in 1984. He joined the European Tour the following year after coming through final qualifying school. He failed to hold on to his tour card in his rookie season, but was back on tour after another successful visit to qualifying school.

Having lost his playing privileges again at the end of the 1986 season, when he made just one cut, Hunter did not return to the European Tour until 1990. He maintained consistent form though the 1990s earning sufficient money each season to retain his tour card until the end of 1998. His only win on the tour came at the 1995 Portuguese Open, and that season he finished a career high 63rd on the European Tour Order of Merit. He also won the 1987 Northern Open, a non-tour event.

Hunter became a successful golf coach. He worked with many top professionals, including 1999 Open Champion Paul Lawrie from 1998 to 2004, and LPGA Tour player Catriona Matthew. He also provided coaching to Scottish golfers Stephen Gallacher, Alastair Forsyth and Gary Orr.

Death
Hunter died at the Beatson Oncology Centre on 14 October 2011 from leukaemia, two years after his diagnosis with the disease. He was 48.

Professional wins (5)

European Tour wins (1)

European Tour playoff record (1–0)

Other wins (4)
1985 Granite City Classic
1986 Carnoustie Challenge
1987 Northern Open, Scottish Under-25 Championship

Results in major championships

Note: Hunter only played in The Open Championship.

CUT = missed the half-way cut

Team appearances
Amateur
Jacques Léglise Trophy (representing Great Britain & Ireland): 1981 (winners)

References

External links

Scottish male golfers
Virginia Tech Hokies men's golfers
European Tour golfers
British golf instructors
Golfers from Glasgow
Deaths from leukemia
Deaths from cancer in Scotland
1963 births
2011 deaths